Aguiluz is both a given name and surname. Notable people with the name include:

Aguiluz, a lead character in the Mulawin series played by Richard Gutierrez
Tikoy Aguiluz (born 1952), Filipino film director, producer, screenwriter, and cinematographer

Spanish-language surnames